Denton Hall may refer to:

Denton Hall, Wharfedale, UK
Former name of a solicitor firm now known as Denton Wilde Sapte

Architectural disambiguation pages